The 2019 Lao FF Cup is the second edition of the Lao FF Cup, the knockout football tournament in Laos. The tournament returns after last held in 2014. It is scheduled to start on 13 July 2019.

The draw of the tournament was held on 3 July 2019. A total of 14 teams compete in the tournament.

First round
Matches played on 13–14 July 2019.

13 July: LAO TOYOTA FC 9-0 VIENGCHANH FC 

13 July: POLICE FC 2-1 MASTER 7 FC 

13 July: QUEST UNITED 1-1 VIENTIANE FT ( PK: 5-4 ) 

14 July: NUOL FC 0-1 EVO UNITED 

14 July: VIENTIANE CAPITAL FC 0-0 BEARS LAO FA ( PK: 4-2 ) 

14 July: ARMY FC 0-3 YOUNG ELEPHANTS FC 

Bye to quarter-finals: KPS FC, TRINITY FC

Quarter-finals
Matches played on 10–11 August 2019.

10 August: TRINITY FC 2-8 EVO UNITED 

11 August: POLICE FC 7-0 QUEST UNITED 

11 August: YOUNG ELEPHANTS FC 2-0 VIENTIANE CAPITAL FC 

21 August (postponed from 10 August): KPS FC 0-15 LAO TOYOTA FC

Semi-finals
Matches played on 24 August 2019.

24 August: YOUNG ELEPHANTS FC 0-1 EVO UNITED 

24 August: POLICE FC 0-2 LAO TOYOTA FC

Final
Match played on 28 September 2019.

LAO TOYOTA FC 8-0 EVO UNITED

Brackets

See also
2019 Lao Premier League

References

External links
Facebook page of Lao Football Federation

Football competitions in Laos
Laos
2019 in Laotian football